This is a list of the fishes of the Pune district in India. The Pune district includes the basin of the Bhima River which joins the Krishna River. The fishes recorded from this region are arranged by taxonomy.

Order Osteoglossiformes

Suborder Notopteridei

Family: Noptopteridae 
 Notopterus chitla (Pallas)
 Notopterus notopterus (Pallas)

Order Anguilliformes

Suborder Anguilloidae

Family: Anguillidae (Freshwater eels) 
 Anguilla bengalensis (Gray)

Order Cypriniformes

Suborder Cyprinoidei

Family: Cyprinidae 
Subfamily Cultrinae
 Chela cachius (Hamilton-Buchanan)
 Chela laubuca (Hamilton)
 Salmostoma acinaces (Valenciennes)
 Salmostoma boopis (Day)
 Salmostoma clupoides (Bloch)
 Salmostoma novacula (Valenciennes)
 Salmostoma phulo (Hamilton)
Subfamily Rasborinae
 Amblypharyngodon mola (Hamilton - Buchanan)
 Barilius barna (Hamilton-Buchanan)
 Barilius bendelisis (Hamilton - Buchanan)
 Barilius gatensis (Valenciennes)
 Danio aequipinnatus (McClelland)
 Danio devario (Hamilton- Buchnan)
 Danio malabaricus (Jerdon)
 Parluciosoma daniconius (Hamilton - Buchanan)
 Parluciosoma labiosa (Mukerji)
Subfamily Cyprininae
  Cyprinus carpio Linnaeus
  Tor khudree (Sykes)
  Tor mussulah (Sykes)
  Osteobrama cotio peninsularis (Silas)
  Osteobrama cotio cunma (Silas)
  Osteobrama cotio neilli (Day)
  Osteobrama cotio vigorsii (Sykes)
  Osteocheilus godavarinsis (Rao)
  Osteocheilus nashii (Day)
  Osteocheilus thomassi (Day)
  Puntius sarana sarana (Hamilton - Buchanan)
  Puntius sarana subnasutus (Valenciennes)
  Puntius amphibius (Valenciennes)
  Puntius arenatus (Day)
  Puntius chola (Hamilton-Buchanan)
  Puntius conchonius (Hamilton-Buchanan)
  Puntius dorsalis (Jerdon)
  Puntius jerdoni (Day)
  Puntius melanostigma (Day)
  Puntius sophore (Hamilton - Buchanan)
  Puntius ticto (Hamilton - Buchanan)
  Rohetee ogilbii (Sykes)
  Schismatirhyncus nukta (Sykes)
  Gonoproktopterus kolus (Sykes)
  Gonoproktopterus thomassi (Day)
  Catla catla (Hamilton - Buchanan)
  Cirrhinus cirrhosus (Bloch)
  Cirrhinus mrigala (Hamilton - Buchanan)
  Cirrhinus reba (Hamilton - Buchanan)
  Labeo fulungee (Sykes)
  Labeo rohita (Hamilton - Buchanan)
  Labeo ariza (Hamilton - Buchanan)
  Labeo boggut (Sykes)
  Labeo calbasu (Hamilton - Buchanan)
  Labeo fimbriatus (Bloch.)
  Labeo kawrus (Sykes)
  Labeo porcellus (Heckel)
  Labeo potail (Sykes)
  Labeo sindensis (Day
  Neolissochilus wynaadensis (Day)
Subfamily Cyprininae
 Garra mullya (Sykes)
 Garra gotyla gotyla (Gray)
 Crossocheilus latius latius (Hamilton- Buchanan)

Family: Parapsilorhynchidae 
 Parapsilorhynchus tentaculatus (Annandale)

Family: Balitoridae 
Subfamily: Nemacheilinae
  Nemacheilus anguilla Annandale
  Nemacheilus denisoni dayi Hora
  Nemacheilus denisoni denisoni Day
  Nemacheilus evezardi Day
  Nemacheilus moreh (Sykes)
  Nemacheilus rueppelli (Sykes)
  Nemacheilus savona (Hamilton-Buchanan)
  Nemacheilus striatus Day

Family: Cobitidae 
Subfamily Cobitinae
  Lepidocephalus thermalis (Valenciennes)
  Lepidocephalus guntea (Hamilton-Buchanan)

Order – Siluriformes

Family: Siluridae 

 Ompok bimaculatus (Bloch)
 Ompok pabo (Hamilton)
 Wallagu attu (Schneider)

Family: Schibeidae 

Subfamily Schibeinae 
 Proeutropiichthys taakree taakree (Sykes)
 Silonia childreni (Sykes)

Family: Bagridae 

Subfamily Bagrinae 
 Mystus bleekeri (Day)
 Mystus cavacius (Hamilton- Buchanan)
 Mystus gulio (Hamilton-Buchanan)
 Mystus malabaricus (Jerdon)
 Aorichthys seenghala (Sykes)
 Rita kuturnee (Sykes)
 Rita pavimentata (Valenciennes)
 Rita rita (Hamilton- Buchanan)

Family: Sisoridae 

 Bagarius bagarius (Hamilton- Buchanan)
 Bagarius yarrelli Sykes
 Glyptothorax conirostre poonensis Hora
 Glyptothorax lonah (Sykes)
 Glyptothorax madraspatanum (Day)
 Nangra itchkeea (Sykes)

Family: Heteropneustidae 

 Heteropneustes fossilis (Bloch)

Family: Aplocheilidae 

 Aplocheilus lineatus (Valenciennes)
 Aplocheilus panchax ( Hamilton - Buchanan)

Family: Poeciliidae 

 Gambusia affinis (Baird & Girard)
 Poecilia reticulata Peters
 Xiphophorus hellerii Heckel

Family: Clariidae 

 Clarias batrachus (Linnaeus)

Order Beloniformes

Suborder Belonoidei (= Exocoetoidei)

Family: Belonidae 
 Xenentodon cancila (Hamilton- Buchanan)

Order Synbranchiformes

Suborder Mastacembelidae

Family: Mastacembelidae 
 Macrognathus aral (Bloch and Schneider)
 Macrognathus pancalus Hamilton – Buchanan
 Mastacembelus armatus (Lacepede)

Order Perciformes

Suborder Percoidei

Family: Chandidae 
 Chanda nama (Hamilton- Buchanan)
 Pseudoambassius ranga (Hamilton- Buchanan)

Family: Mugilidae 
 Rhinomugil corsula (Hamilton-Buchanan)

Family: Nandidae 
 Nandus nandus (Hamilton- Buchanan)

Suborder Labroidei

Family: Cichlidae 
 Oreochromis mossambica (Peters)

Suborder Gobioidei

Family: Gobiidae 
 Glossogobius giuris (Hamilton- Buchanan)

Family: Belontiidae 
 Macropodus cupanus (Valenciennes)

Suborder Channoidei

Family: Channidae 
 Channa punctatus (Bloch)
 Channa striatus (Bloch)
 Channa orientalis Bloch and Schneider
 Channa marulius (Hamilton-Buchanan)

See also
List of fish in India

References
 FishBase http://www.fishbase.org

Pune
Fishes Of Pune District
Fish, Pune
Pune, fish